The Islamabad women's cricket team is the women's representative cricket team for Islamabad. They competed in the National Women's Cricket Championship between 2005–06 and 2017.

History
Islamabad joined the National Women's Cricket Championship for its second season in 2005–06, winning one of their two matches in the Rawalpindi Zone. The following season, 2006–07, the side qualified for the final stage of the competition after they won Group C, but lost both of their matches to finish third overall. 

The side competed in every subsequent edition of the National Women's Cricket Championship until it ended in 2017, with high points including winning Pool B in 2012–13, beating Sialkot in the final, and qualifying for the final Super League stage in 2016, finishing 4th overall.

Players

Notable players
Players who played for Islamabad and played internationally are listed below, in order of first international appearance (given in brackets):

 Zehmarad Afzal (2000)
 Naila Nazir (2009)
 Diana Baig (2015)

Seasons

National Women's Cricket Championship

Honours
 National Women's Cricket Championship:
 Winners (0):
 Best finish: 3rd (2006–07)

See also
 Federal Capital women's cricket team
 Islamabad cricket team

References

Women's cricket teams in Pakistan
Cricket in Islamabad